Tegolophus is a genus of acari, including the following species:
 Tegolophus alicis Manson, 1984
 Tegolophus australis Keifer, 1964
 Tegolophus meliflorus Manson, 1984
 Tegolophus poriruensis Manson, 1984

References

Eriophyidae
Trombidiformes genera